Within the city-operated parks system of New York City, there are many parks that are either named after individuals of Irish and Irish American descent, or contain monuments relating to Ireland.

Manhattan

Duane Park
Foley Square
James J Walker Park
Father Fagan Park
Ahearn Park
DeWitt Clinton Park
McCaffrey Playground
Father Duffy Square
Finn Square
McKenna Square
Murphy Brothers Playground
Mary O'Connor Playground
Donellan Square
Maher Circle
Amelia Gorman Park
Dorothy K. McGowan Memorial Garden
Mitchel Square
Reggie Fitzgerald Triangle
John Wolfe Ambrose monument at Battery Park
Francis Makemie plaque at Bowling Green Park

The State of New York constructed the Irish Hunger Memorial in Battery Park City

Bronx

Ryan Triangle
Hylan Park
O'Neill Triangle
Barry Plaza
O'Brien Oval
Murphy Triangle
Whalen Grove
Major Deegan Expressway
James Burke Ballfield
DeRosa O'Boyle Triangle

Queens

Buz O'Rourke Playground
Crowley Playground
Dwyer Square
Fagan Square
Noonan Playground
Patrick Jerome Gleason Square
Murray Playground
Gorman Playground
O'Sullivan Plaza
Frank D. O'Connor Playground
McKenna Triangle
Rafferty Triangle
Police Officer Edward Byrne Park
Maurice FitzGerald Playground
David J. O'Connell Square
Daniel M. O'Connell Playground
Kennedy Playground
O'Donohue Park

Brooklyn

Commodore Barry Park
Father Kehoe Square
Heffernan Triangle
J.J. Byrne Playground
John J. Carty Park
Patrick O'Rourke Playground
Kelly Park Playground
Callahan-Kelly Playground
Kennedy King Playground
John F. Kennedy Memorial at Grand Army Plaza
Robert F. Kennedy Memorial at Columbus Park

Staten Island

Brady's Pond Park
Dongan Playground
Drumgoole Tot Lot
Mahoney Playground
Irish Hunger monument at Silver Lake Park

References

Squares in New York City
Monuments and memorials in New York City
Irish-American culture in New York City
New York City parks-related lists